Killian is a town in Livingston Parish, Louisiana, United States. The population was 1,206 at the 2010 census. It is part of the Baton Rouge Metropolitan Statistical Area.

Geography
Killian is located at  (30.367113, -90.566390).

Demographics

As of the census of 2000, there were 1,053 people, 407 households, and 310 families residing in the village. The racial makeup of the village was 81.48% White, 17.09% African American, 0.09% Native American, 0.47% from other races, and 0.85% from two or more races. Hispanic or Latino of any race were 0.85% of the population.

There were 407 households, out of which 30.2% had children under the age of 18 living with them, 66.3% were married couples living together, 6.1% had a female householder with no husband present, and 23.8% were non-families. 19.4% of all households were made up of individuals, and 5.9% had someone living alone who was 65 years of age or older. The average household size was 2.59 and the average family size was 2.95.

In the village, the population was spread out, with 23.6% under the age of 18, 7.9% from 18 to 24, 26.9% from 25 to 44, 29.5% from 45 to 64, and 12.1% who were 65 years of age or older. The median age was 39 years. For every 100 females, there were 104.9 males. For every 100 females age 18 and over, there were 101.0 males.

The median income for a household in the village was $40,781, and the median income for a family was $42,885. Men had a median income of $41,058 versus $25,833 for women. The per capita income for the village was $19,648. About 7.3% of families and 10.2% of the population were below the poverty line, including 12.8% of those under age 18 and 10.2% of those age 65 or over.

Education
Killian is within the Livingston Parish Public Schools system. The local government of Killian has yet to build a school of its own. Instead, the students in the area attend nearby Springfield Elementary, Middle, and High Schools.

References

Villages in Livingston Parish, Louisiana
Villages in Louisiana
Baton Rouge metropolitan area